Archipimima vermelhana is a species of moth of the family Tortricidae. It was described by Razowski in 2004. It is found in Brazil in the states of São Paulo and Santa Catarina.

The ground colour of the forewings is creamy, tinged yellow along the wing edges and the middle and sprinkled with brownish. The markings are brown. The hindwings are creamy, mixed with brownish on the periphery.

References

Atteriini
Moths described in 2004
Moths of South America
Taxa named by Józef Razowski